Neemuch or Nimach is a city in the malwa   region. Neemuch crowns the north western part of MP. It has been also referred to city of Nature and Peace. The town shares its northwestern border with the state of Rajasthan and is the administrative headquarters of Neemuch District. Formerly a large British cantonment of Gwalior princely state, in 1822 the town became the headquarters of the combined Rajputana–Malwa political agency and of the Malwa Agency in 1895. The British Cantonment was disbanded in 1932 after which it was maintained by a British Municipal Board.

Etymology
A number of myths surround the name Neemuch. One is that the city received its name because of the large number of Neem trees found here. While other story states that city's first dwellers belonged to Meena caste, leading to the name "Meenuch", which over time became Neemuch. A further theory is that "Nimach" is an abbreviation of "North India Mounted Artillery and Cavalry Headquarters".

History

The city was the location of a palace in the district of the Ajmer. Originally a part of the territory of Malwa, it was given to the Rana in 1768 to pay off debts incurred by the Rana (king) of Mewar. After that, it became a British cantonment of the Gwalior princely state, except for short periods in 1794 and 1844 and 1965. The Neemuch cantonment played a significant role in the Indian Rebellion of 1857 and was the centre of disturbances in Malwa. Freed from the hand of Britishers, Neemuch has always climbed the stairs of Progress and Success.

In 1857, Neemuch was the most southerly place to which the rebellion extended. A brigade of native Bengal troops were stationed at Neemuch, then mutinied and marched to Delhi. European officers took refuge in the fort, and were later besieged by a rebel force from Mandsaur. The Europeans defended the city until relieved by the Malwa field force. Since 1895 Neemuch has been the headquarters of the political agent in Malwa, a subdivision of the British Central India Agency.

Neemuch was also the station for the following Indian Army Regiments:
 Bombay Army - 2nd Bombay Light Cavalry
 Bombay Army - 3rd Bombay Light Cavalry (Lancers) 
 Bombay Army - 23rd Bombay Native Light Infantry
 Bengal Army - 37th Regiment of Bengal Native Infantry
 Bengal Army - 49th Regiment of Bengal Native Infantry
 Bengal Army - 72nd Regiment of Bengal Native Infantry

Neemuch was also the station of the 26th and 48th field artillery batteries of the British in India.

Geography
Neemuch district is part of the Ujjain Division. It borders Rajasthan to the west and north and Mandsaur district to the east and south. It was split from Mandsaur District on 30June 1998.

The city is divided into three main parts: Neemuch city, Chhavani, and Baghana.

Chhavani is the main commercial area hosting Pustak bazzar, Dusshera maidan, Satya Path, Tilak Marg, Budha Gopal street, Bohra gali, Rabindranath Tagore Marg and Sabji Mandi, bus stand, timber market, Ambedkar road and Nasirabad - Mhow National highway no. 56 and Neemuch - Bhopal State Highway no. 87.

Baghana is widely known for its 'Anaj Mandi'.

Neemuch city is the main old city of Neemuch hosting PG College, Ravan Rundi, Mochi Gali, Kila, Neemuch Manasa road.

The Neemuch district has approximately 956,000 inhabitants as of 2001.

Distances to other towns:

Demographics 

As of the 2011 Census of India, Neemuch had a population of 127,000. Males constitute 53% of the population and females 47%. Neemuch has an average literacy rate of 85%, higher than the national average of 59.5%: male literacy is 77%, and female literacy is 62%. In Neemuch, 14% of the population is under 6 years of age.

According to 2011 census 70.31% of the population of Neemuch District is in rural areas while 29.69% is in urban areas.

Neemuch District has fourth lowest rural growth rate of 11% in Madhya Pradesh, while state average is 18.4%, highest being 31.7% of Jhabua.

Physiography

Neemuch district comes under the agroclimatic zone Malva Plateau, lies between the parallels of latitude 24°15’ – 24°35’ north, and between the meridians of longitude 74°45’ - 75°37’ east spread over an area of 3,875 square kilometres. It has surrounding of Kota, Jhalawar, Chittaurgarh and Pratapgarh District of Rajasthan State while Mandsaur District of Madhya Pradesh.

Environment (climate)
Due to the location of Neemuch in the Malwa region. the climate is pleasant. The highest maximum temperature of 46° is reached in May and June and remains up to last week of June. In winters, the minimum temperature reaches 2 °C in the months of December and January. The average rainfall of Neemuch is 812 mm and maximum rainfall occurs in month of July and August. The lowest rainfall of 501.6 mm was recorded in 2007 where as maximum rainfall of 1352 mm occurred in 2006. The reason for drop in rainfall in 2007 was due to the drought conditions in the district.
Wind direction is from south—west to north in April to September months and in the remaining months of the year it is north—east direction to south-west direction. Wind speed is low in two months of the year.

Soil 
The soils in the district are generally of four types viz., medium deep black cotton soil, red loamy soil, laterite soil and alluvial soil. Black cotton soil is derived from weathering and disintegration of basaltic lava flow. Major parts of the district are covered by medium deep black soils. Red loamy soils consist of sandy loam to clay loam and brick in colour. This soil is derived from Vindhyan sandstone and shale and occurring in valley portion on the plateau and adjacent to hill composed of Vindhyan sandstone. This type of soil covers a Northern part of the district. Laterite soil dark brown to pink coloured lateritic soil is found as capping over hillocks of basaltic terrain. Alluvial soils are greyish yellow to brownish yellow in colour and occupy along the major rivers.

Economy 
Neemuch is known for Krishi Upaj Mandi (Agriculture Produce Market). This is main market for all the livelihood and another attraction is CRPF.

Neemuch was the birthplace of the Central Reserve Police Force (CRPF) in 1939 and is home to a large scale army recruitment centre for the organisation. The CRPF still maintains part of Neemuch's British Military Cantonment, which was the first of its kind in India. The bungalow area, native troops area, bazaar, fields and gardens were maintained initially by the municipal board and later by the Municipal Council. After independence Neemuch and the Baghana area were included in the municipal area. Neemuch is known as India's Eye donation capital as it accounts for the highest per capita eye donation rate in the country'. Neemuch also has Asia's largest opium alkaloid processing plant which is a government-owned company named- Opium and Alkaloid Works. It is a road junction and distribution centre for agricultural products. Handloom weaving is the major industry here.

The local economy of Neemuch is mainly based on the agriculture produce market (called Krishi Upaj Mandi in Hindi) which is Asia's largest agriculture produce market yard and the world's second largest as per 2011 report by MCX and WTO in terms of the agricultural products arrival. Many types of cereals, pulses, spices, oil seeds and herbs are traded in the agriculture market of Neemuch. 
Cereals such as wheat, barley, maize or corn, jowar. Spices such as coriander, fenugreek, ajwain, poppy seeds or posta, jeera, black cumin or kalongi, halim seeds, suwa, tukmaria. Pulses such  are gram, urad, moong, masoor, peas. Oil seeds such as soybean, black mustard, yellow mustard, flax seeds, groundnut, sesame seeds, taramira seeds, castor seeds, dolmi and many more agri products such as garlic, onion, guar seeds, isabgol seeds. 
Neemuch is a prominent trading centre of herbs in India and is the only auction and trading centre of ashwagandha roots (Indian ginseng, withania somnifera) in the world. More than 500 kinds of herbs are traded in Neemuch. Majorly they are ashwagandha, kalmegh, shatawari, safed musli, stevia leaves, giloy, and babul.
Neemuch is a dominant trading place in the food processing industry and has many cooking oil mills, solvent extraction plants, pulses processing plants, dehydration plants, herbal extraction plants and isabgol husk plants.

Neemuch district is one of the largest producers of opium in the country. Neemuch also has one of the only two opium factories in India. The climate of Neemuch district is apt for the production of opium and thus the opium trade is one of the major cultivated crops in the region. Other major cultivated products are oranges, lemons, red and pink roses and numerous herbs.

Major exportable items are: isabgol, ashwagandha and many kind of herbs, methi, ajwain, coriander, soybean products like oil, de-oiled cake, soya paneer, soya papar, soy milk, garlic powder, onion powder, dehydrated flakes of onion and garlic, red chili powder, leather garments, and artificial jewelry.

Milestones

Welspun Solar MP project 

Welspun Solar MP project, Asia's largest solar power plant, inaugurated by Narendra Modi, as BJP's prime ministerial candidate. It is a 151 megawatt photo-voltaic power station constructed at a cost of 1,100 crore rupees (about $182,000,000) on 305 hectares (750 acres) of land operating since February 2014 at Neemuch.

Neemuch also has one of the only 51 automatic solar resource monitoring stations (ASRMS) in India. The implementation started in February 2011 and it was commissioned on 30 September 2011. It is to assess and quantify the solar radiation availability, along with weather parameters, with a view to develop a solar atlas. Report of Solar Radiation Resource Assessment (SRRA) Station at Neemuch can be found online. It indicates monthly values of solar radiation and meteorological parameters.

Gomabai Netralaya 
An ophthalmic centre that under the leadership of G.D. Agrawal and the help of Ramji Lal Goel, Gomabai Netralaya was established at Neemuch in 1992.
Within a span of a decade, it has become one of the leading ophthalmic centres in India. Neemuch, though situated in Madhya Pradesh, is located close to Rajasthan and Gujarat.. Therefore, tribal and rural poor from these states constitute 70% of patients. Gomabai Netralaya has played a key role in achieving the highest per capita rate of eye donation in India for Neemuch and the facilities provided by the institute for performing penetrating keratoplasty, can provide a complete solution to the problem of corneal blindness in the region.
Gomabai Netralaya is also involved in a continuous process of educating staff and conducting research into the cause and cure of blinding eye diseases.

Food Park
Located at village Jhanjharwada and Dhamaniya and Soniyana village of Neemuch district (M.P). The proposed food park assumes a sizing of 55.74 ha or 137 acres, as an outcome of detailed demand assessment and infrastructure planning. The land reportedly houses mineral deposits worth Rs 2,500 crores. The mineral is rare across the world, and the situation is same in India. This is being developed under Delhi-Mumbai Industrial Corridor (DMIC).

Tourism and places of interest

Shri Kileshwar Mahadev Temple

The most important festival of Neemuch is the Shivratri festival which is celebrated every year in the month of March at this temple.
Religious tourism to the Kileshwar temple also contributes to the local economy as 50,000 devotees from the town and nearby visit during Shivratri. This festival is arranged and managed by the Municipal Council of Neemuch. Ground at the temple is also used as a picnic spot for school children as it consists of a small amusement park and large ground covered with grass.

Sukhanandji Ashram

Sukhanandji Ashram or Sukhanand Dham is situated at a distance of about 32 km from Nimach on the border of Rajasthan in an ancient rock cave. There is a temple of Shiva here. There is a spring of perennial water. It is said to be founded by Śuka, the son of Vedavyasa. A character in a number of Puranic texts belonging to various traditions, mainly Vaishnavism. He is believed to be a son of Vyasadeva. It also believed that Vedavyasa first wrote Bharata-Samhita which contained twenty-four thousand verses (slokas) and taught that to his son Śuka.

There are two annual fairs organized at this place: one on Haryali amavashya of Srawan month and other on Baisakh purnima.

Nava Toran temple

Nava Toran temple or Nav Toran Temple at village Khor is in a ruined condition. It contains a proch, mahamandapa and garbhagriha and pradakshinapth. It has a Siva linga in the sanctum. The exterior is ornamented with simple mouldings (c.12th century). This monument has been declared to be of national importance under the Ancient Monuments and Archaeological Sites and Remains Act, 1958 (24 of 1958).

Gandhi Sagar Sanctuary

Gandhi Sagar Sanctuary is a wildlife sanctuary situated on the northern boundary of Mandsaur and Nimach districts in Madhya Pradesh. It is spread over an area of 368.62 km square adjoining Rajasthan state in India. It was notified in 1974 and more area was added in 1983. The Chambal River passes through the sanctuary and divides into two parts. The western part is in Nimach district and eastern part is in Mandsaur district.

Morwan Dam

Morwan Dam is 24 km from Neemuch and constructed on river Gambhiri. It is mainly used for irrigation and water supply to nearby places. Boating facilities are also available.
Frequent buses are available to reach there (Neemuch-Singoli-Kota Road).

Bhadwa Mata Temple
The Bhadwamata Temple is situated 19 km from Neemuch town in Bhadva village. It is believed that who so ever takes bath in the Baori situated in the temple premises get cured of paralysis and Polio. During Nav Ratri a 9 day long festival takes place in this temple where about two lac devotes from all over the country visit this temple. Apart from that temple, there is one more temple in the near vicinity of Neemuch town namely Bhanwarmata (25 km).

Aantri Mata Temple 
Aantri Mata temple is situated at antri village at the distance of 54 km from Neemuch. The temple is famous for boon of Mata Aantri devi. Thouands of pilgrims visits here in Navratri and Diwali.

Notable people 

Umashanker Muljibhai Trivedi was a noted personality of Neemuch. He was Member of Parliament in the 1st and 3rd Lok Sabha. He was also a senior lawyer at the Supreme Court of India. His residence was Bungalow Number 11 in Neemuch Cantt. and had is office in Pustak Bazaar. 
V. S. Wakankar was an India archeologist. who discovered the Bhimbetka rock caves in 1957. He was awarded Padmashri by the Indira Gandhi government in January 1975.
Virendra Kumar Sakhlecha, Chief Minister of Madhya Pradesh from 18 January 1978 – 19 January 1980
Sunderlal Patwa, Chief Minister of Madhya Pradesh from 20 January 1980 - 17 February 1980 and 5 March 1990 – 15 December 1992. He was awarded Padma Vibhushan, the second-highest civilian award, posthumously in 2017 by the Government of India.
Chander Prakash Gurnani or   C. P. Gurnani (born December 19, 1958) is the CEO & Managing Director of Tech Mahindra.
Abidali Neemuchwala, Indian businessman

Social infrastructure 

There are two PG: colleges, one for law and another for arts. There are 196 primary schools, six senior secondary schools, 15 secondary schools and 42 middle schools in Neemuch city as per 2001 census figures. Besides these, there are 20 middle schools and 30 primary schools run by private institutions. There are two stadiums and one swimming pool in the city. There are 30 parks and gardens, one Dushara Maidan, 22 auditoriums and four public libraries exist in the city. There are six kabristans and four cremation grounds.

•  Government Medical College, Neemuch is the proposed Medical college by the Government of Madhya Pradesh. for the people of Neemuch District to improve the Health Infrastructure of the city.

Libraries and archives 

The public library of the district is situated in the Dr. B.R. Ambedkar Town Hall.

Minerals 
Production of mineral 2010-11

Large-scale industries / public sector undertakings 
List of the units in Neemuch and nearby

 Government Afeem and Kshrod Industries, Neemuch
 Vikram cement, Khor

Sports 
Neemuch has a rich sporting history, especially in soccer. Despite being a small town, Neemuch has produced a number of players who have played in the Indian soccer league. Neemuch has about 12 local soccer clubs which participate in the tournament organized by local municipal council every year. Cricket is also a very popular sport.

In Madhya Pradesh also football is second-largest sport. Over 9,000 players play from over 1,500 clubs across the state. There are as many as 70 all-India and 100 state-level tournaments each year.

Football teams
Central Reserve Police (Neemuch)
Neemuch XI

Neemuch's Olympic size swimming pool, known as Padm Taran Pushkar, was inaugurated in 1978. It has 1-metre and 3-metre springboards and 5-metre and  diving platforms.

Infrastructural facilities 
Neemuch has a well-developed infrastructure for education, health and public utilities. Public facilities along with six hospitals and dispensaries. Two-degree colleges, six senior secondary schools, 16 secondary schools, 42 middle schools, 196 primary schools exist in the city. Bus stand for private buses and state roadways exist at the same location. Three fire tenders, telephone exchanges, GPO, four electric sub stations, four police stations also exist in the city.

Under Atal Jyoti Abhiyan, Neemuch has a constant power supply since 25 May 2013. Neemuch district's population is 8 lakh 25 thousand 958 and a total number of villages 674. Number of power consumers is 1 lakh 65 thousand 565 including 39 thousand 956 permanent agriculture pumps consumers. In the district, average power load is 70-75 MW, 53 feeders of 33/11 KV and 196 of 11 KV. There are 176 rural and 20 urban feeders. Besides, length of 33 KV lines is 644 kilometres, 11 KV lines 3,306 kilometres, low-tension lines (aerial bunch cable) 2,553 kilometres and low-tension lines 8.285 kilometres.

Transportation

Rail 
Neemuch is an important broad gauge railway station of Ajmer — Ratlam route. Neemuch railway station was constructed by the British in 1880. It has direct links to Ratlam, Ujjain via Nagda and Kota and Bundi in Rajasthan via Chittorgarh. It is about 140  km from Ratlam and 60  km from Chittorgarh by rail and road.
A demand for a separate rail line from Neemuch via Jawad, Singoli (two Tehsil headquarters) to Kota has been raised by its people and representatives that will reduce the distance between Neemuch and Kota by about 40 km and a survey was also passed by former Rail Minister Mallikarjun Kharge in his interim rail budget in 2014.

Road 
Neemuch has a network of district roads and National Highway 79 connecting with other cities of this district, Madhya Pradesh state and neighbouring Rajasthan state. NH 79 links it to Ajmer, Chittor and Ratlam of MP. The state highway connects the city with Udaipur in Rajasthan via Chhoti Sadri. Except for the national highway, district roads going to Singoli and Manasa are maintained by state PWD where as the city roads are maintained by the municipal council.

The roads within the CRPF area are maintained by the central government. This city has one bus stand.

Air 

An airstrip also exists on the south of the railway line near Jaisinghpura village.

Operating agency Indian Air Force.

An air taxi service is introduced by Madhya Pradesh Tourism (with Ventura AirConnect) which provides air connectivity with Neemuch on requirement.

Media

Radio
Neemuch has only one FM radio channel All India Radio at 100.1 MHz. It is a low-power transmitter relay of 100 W.

Newspaper
Apart from major newspaper publishing houses, various regional publishers are also dominant in the city, namely "Hindi Khabarwaala Web & App News (हिंदी ख़बरवाला वेब न्यूज़ चैनल", "Voice of MP Android News App" Neemcuch Mandi Bhav Website "mkisan" "Nai Vidha" Dashpur Express, Malwa Today, Malwa Darshan, Neemuch Patrika. Dominant state newspaper publishing houses are Nai duniya Dainik Bhaskar and Raj Express. Hindi Gyani

Books, novels, and poems
 The Conceited Sparrow of Neemuch: A Conceit in Four Flights of Fancy (1880)
 The name of Neemuch is also mentioned in the poem "The Seven Seas/The Ladies" by Rudyard Kipling who is a British author and poet, born in Bombay.
Narrative of a Journey Through the Upper Provinces of India, Volume 2 by Reginald Heber
Studies In Indian History: Rajasthan Through the Ages the Heritage of Rajputs (set Of 5 volumes)

References 

Neemuch Mandi Bhav
Mandsaur Today News

External links

 
Cities in Madhya Pradesh